

National flag

Ethnic group flags

Subdivision flags

Departments

Autonomous Regions

Political flags

Historical flags

See also 

 Flag of Nicaragua
 Coat of arms of Nicaragua

References 

Lists and galleries of flags
Flags